The AFC first round of 1998 FIFA World Cup qualification was contested between 36 AFC members.

The top country in each group at the end of the stage progressed to the final round, where the ten remaining teams will be divided into two groups of five.

Group 1

Group 2

Note: This match broke the score difference record in FIFA A-level matches, while the previous record was created by Denmark in 1908 Summer Olympics against France with 17-1.

Group 3

Group 4

Group 5

Group 6

Group 7

Group 8

Group 9

Group 10

Notes

External links
 RSSSF Page

1998 FIFA World Cup qualification (AFC)
Qual
Qual